Gerald Andrews Hausman (born October 13, 1945) is a storyteller and award-winning author of books about Native America, animals, mythology, and West Indian culture. Hausman has published over seventy books for both children and adults.

Biography 

Born in Baltimore, Maryland, to engineer father Sidney Hausman and mother Dorothy "Little" Hausman, Gerald grew up in New Jersey and Massachusetts before moving to New Mexico for college. Hausman attended New Mexico Highlands University in Las Vegas, New Mexico, where he obtained his B.A. in English Literature.

After graduation, Hausman married Loretta "Lorry" Wright and moved to Lenox, Massachusetts, where he taught creative writing and English at the Windsor Mountain School. The Hausmans, along with David Silverstein, founded The Bookstore Press, which published some of the first paperback books for children. These included such authors as Ruth Krauss, Maurice Sendak, Crockett Johnson, Aram Saroyan and Paul Metcalf. In 1977, Gerald and Lorry moved to Tesuque, New Mexico, where they lived for seventeen years, raising two daughters, Hannah and Mariah.

During this time, Hausman worked as poetry teacher, editor, publisher and English teacher at Santa Fe Preparatory School in nearby Santa Fe, going on to found the Blue Harbour School of Creative Writing on the former estate of playwright Noël Coward in Port Maria, Jamaica. In addition, he worked as a poet in the schools in the city of Pittsfield, Massachusetts.

Starting with the 2002 publication The Boy From Nine Miles: The Early Life of Bob Marley, Hausmann has collaborated on five books co-authored with Cedella Marley, the daughter of late musician Bob Marley.

Hausman has performed readings and storytellings throughout the United States and Europe. He has also been a presenter for National Public Radio, History Channel, Haunted History: Caribbean, John F. Kennedy Center for the Performing Arts, Miami Book Fair International and American Library Association.

Awards 

Union College Poetry Prize, 1965 for Quebec Poems
American Folklore Society, Aesop Accolade Award (Children's Section), 1995 for Duppy Talk: West Indian Tales of Mystery and Magic
Notable Social Studies Book for Young people designation, Children's Book Council (CBC)/ National Council for the Social Studies, 1996, and 1999, for Doctor Bird: Three Lookin' Up Tales from Jamaica
Pick of the Lists Selection, the American Booksellers Association (ABA), 1999, for Dogs of Myth: Tales from Around the World
Bank Street College of Education Best Book Selection, 2000, for Tom Cringle: Battle on the High Seas and Cats of Myth: Tales from around the World
Parents' Choice Award Silver Medal for NonFiction, designation, 2003
New York Public Library Best Book for the Teen Age designation, 2004 for Escape from Botany Bay
National Council for the Social Studies/Children's Book Council, Best Book Designation, 2007, for A Mind With Wings
Midwest Book Awards Children's Picture Books, Illustration: Graphic, and Total Book Design, USA Today Best Books Award, Foreword IndieFab Book of the Year in Picture Books, Early Reader, 2013, for "The Otter, The Spotted Frog and the Great Flood: A Creek Indian Story."

Works

Fiction

 The Shivurrus Plant of Mopant, Giligia Press, 1968
 New Marlboro Stage, Giligia Press, 1968 & Bookstore Press, 1971
 Circle Meadow, Bookstore Press, 1972
 The Boy with the Sun Tree Bow, Berkshire Traveller, 1973
 Beth: The Little Girl of Pine Knoll, Bookstore Press, 1974
 Sitting on the Blue-Eyed Bear: Navajo Myths & Legends, Lawrence Hill, 1975
 Night Herding Song, Copper Canyon Press, 1979
 The Day the White Whales Came to Bangor, Cobblesmith Books, 1979
 No Witness, Stackpole Books, 1980
 Runners, Sunstone Press, 1984
 Meditations with Animals, Bear & Co., 1986
 Meditations with the Navajo, Bear & Co., 1989
 Stargazer, Lotus Press, 1989
 Turtle Dream, Mariposa, 1991
 Turtle Island Alphabet, St. Martin’s Press, 1992
 The Gift of the Gila Monster, Simon & Schuster, 1993
 Ghost Walk, Mariposa, 1993
 Tunkashila, St. Martin’s Press, 1993
 Turtle Island ABC, HarperCollins, 1994
 Duppy Talk, Simon & Schuster, 1994
 The Sun Horse, Lotus Press, 1995
 Coyote Walks on Two Legs, Philomel, 1995
 How Chipmunk Got Tiny Feet, HarperCollins, 1995
 Doctor Moledinky’s Castle, Simon & Schuster, 1995
 Prayer to the Great Mystery, St. Martin’s Press, 1995
 Eagle Boy, HarperCollins, 1996
 Night Flight, Philomel, 1996
 The Kebra Nagast, St. Martin’s Press, 1997
 The Story of Blue Elk, Clarion, 1998
 Doctor Bird, Philomel, 1998
 The Coyote Bead, Hampton Roads, 1999
 Tom Cringle (Book One), illustrated by Tad Hills, Simon & Schuster, 2000
 Tom Cringle (Book Two), illustrated by Tad Hills, Simon & Schuster, 2001
 Castaways: Stories of Survival, Greenwillow, 2003
 Ghost Walk: Native American Tales of the Spirit, Irie Books, 2005
 Duppy Talk: West Indian Tales of Mystery & Magic, Irie Books, 2007
 How Chipmunk Got Tiny Feet, Irie Books, 2008
 Doctor Bird: Three lookin’ Up Tales from Jamaica, Irie Books, 2008
 Time Swimmer, Macmillan Caribbean, 2009
 The Image Taker: The Selected Stories and Photographs of Edward S. Curtis, World Wisdom, 2009
 Mermaids, Manatees and Bimini Blind Snakes: My Life on a Barrier Island, Irie Books, 2012
 Rastafarian Children of Solomon: The Legacy of the Kebra Nagast and the Path to Peace and Understanding, Bear & Co./Inner Traditions, 2013
 The Otter, the Spotted Frog & The Great Flood: A Creek Indian Story, Wisdom Tales Press, 2013
 Island Dreams: Selected Poems, Longhouse Publishers, 2015
 Evil Chasing Way, Speaking Volumes, 2017
 Hand Trembler, Speaking Volumes, 2018
 Sungazer, Speaking Volumes, 2018
 Little Miracles, Stay Thirsty Media, 2019

Digital

 The American Storybag: A Collection of Tales, Stay Thirsty Media, 2010
 Not Since Mark Twain, Stay Thirsty Media, 2012
 Escape From Botany Bay: The True Story of Mary Bryant, Irie Books, 2011
 Wilderness: The Story of Mountain Men John Colter and Hugh Glass, Irie Books, 2011
 All Is Beautiful All Around Me: Navajo Ways and Ceremonial Stories, Irie Books, 2011
 The Mythology of Cats: Feline Legend and Lore Through the Ages, Irie Books, 2011
 The Mythology of Dogs: Canine Legend and Lore Through the Ages, Irie Books, 2011
 The Forbidden Ride: An Icelandic Love Story, Stay Thirsty Media, 2014
 The Evil Chasing Way, Speaking Volumes, 2017
 Hand Trembler, Speaking Volumes, 2018
 Sungazer, Speaking Volumes, 2018

Collaborations with Loretta Hausman

 The Pancake Book, Persea Books, 1975
 The Yogurt Book, Persea Books, 1976
 The Mythology of Dogs, St. Martin's Press, 1997 & Griffin paperback, 1998
 The Mythology of Cats, St. Martin’s Press, 1998 & Berkeley paperback, 2000
 Dogs of Myth: Tales from Around the World (Illustrated by Barry Moser), Simon & Schuster, 1999
 Cats of Myth, Simon & Schuster, 2000
 The Metaphysical Cat, Hampton Roads, 2001
 The Mythology of Horses, Three Rivers/Random House, 2003
 Escape From Botany Bay, Orchard/Scholastic, 2003
 Napoleon and Josephine, Orchard/Scholastic, 2004
 Horses of Myth, E.P. Dutton, 2005
 A Mind with Wings: The Story of Henry David Thoreau, Shambhala/Random House, 2006
 The Healing Horse, Houghton Mifflin, 2006

Other collaborations

 The Berkshire Anthology (with David Silverstein), Bookstore Press, 1972
 Wilderness (with Roger Zelazny), Tor Books, 1994
 African American Alphabet (with Kelvin Rodriques), St. Martin’s Press, 1996
 The Jacob Ladder (with Uton Hinds), Orchard Books, 2001
 The Boy From Nine Miles, (with Cedella Marley), Hampton Roads, 2002
 56 Thoughts From 56 Hope Road, (with Cedella Marley), Tuff Gong Books, 2002
 The Jacob Ladder (with Uton Hinds), Scholastic, 2003
 60 Visions (with Cedella Marley), Tuff Gong Books, 2005
 Three Little Birds (with Cedella Marley), Tuff Gong Books, 2006
 Floating Stone: 21 Thoughts of Kenji Miyazawa,with Kenji Okuhira, Irie Books, 2012
 The Future Is The Beginning: The Words and Wisdom of Bob Marley (with Cedella Marley), Tuff Gong Books/Harmony, 2012
 Guns, Edited by Gerald Hausman, Speaking Volumes, 2016

Audio

 Stargazer, Sunset, 1991
 Turtle Island Alphabet, Sunset, 1992
 Navajo Nights, Sunset, 1993
 Native American Animal Stories, Sunset, 1993
 The Turquoise Horse, Irie Books, 2006
 Drum Talk, Speaking Volumes, 2010
 Ghost Walk, Speaking Volumes, 2010
 Native American Animal Stories, Speaking Volumes, 2010
 Navajo Nights, Speaking Volumes, 2010
 Stargazer, Speaking Volumes, 2010
 The Turquoise Horse, Speaking Volumes, 2010
 Wilderness, Speaking Volumes, 2013
 Meditations With the Navajo, Inner Traditions/Bear & Co., 2019
 Rastafarian Children of Solomon, Inner Traditions/Bear & Co., 2019

References

External links 
 
 American Storybag

Living people
1945 births
American male writers
Writers from Baltimore
New Mexico Highlands University alumni
Central Connecticut State University faculty
American children's writers
People from Tesuque, New Mexico